Metacom (YTB-829) was a United States Navy .

Construction
The contract for Metacom was awarded 5 June 1973. She was laid down on 13 November 1973 at Marinette, Wisconsin, by Marinette Marine and launched 19 June 1974.

Operational history
Metacom served at Naval Submarine Base New London.  Stricken from the Navy List 5 January 2001, ex-Metacom was transferred to the Army Corps of Engineers where she was renamed Demolen.

References

External links
 

 

Natick-class large harbor tugs
Ships built by Marinette Marine
1974 ships